Kultay-Karan (Qoltay-Qaran) is a rural locality (a village) in Bogdanovsky Selsoviet, Miyakinsky District, Bashkortostan, Russia. The population was 204 as of 2010. There are 4 streets.

Geography 
Kultay-Karan is located 32 km southwest of Kirgiz-Miyaki (the district's administrative centre) by road. Dyomsky is the nearest rural locality.

References 

Rural localities in Miyakinsky District